Ceratogyrus dolichocephalus is a species of tarantula. It is endemic to Zimbabwe.

See also 
 List of Theraphosidae species

References

Theraphosidae
Endemic fauna of Zimbabwe
Spiders of Africa
Spiders described in 1919